Manshuk Mametova International Airport, also known as Oral Ak Zhol Airport (formerly known as Uralsk Ak Zhol and Podstepnyy during the Soviet era)  is an airport in Kazakhstan located  southeast of Oral (Uralsk). The airport is located south of the Oral River.

In February 2023, Oral Ak Zhol Airport was acquired by the largest airport holding and management company in Russia, Airports of Regions. The company hopes to develop the Oral airport as a regional hub, to serve Russian travellers affected by the shortage of flights out of Russia owing to its war in Ukraine.

Facilities

It is a small airport servicing medium-sized airliners. It has parking for four jets. This airport has two terminals – domestic and international. The airport also serves the nearby town of Aksai, which provides the majority of Ak Zhol passenger traffic, being the "capital" of the gas industry in West Kazakhstan. In the past, a weekly international charter flight was operated by Astraeus Airlines from Oral to London Gatwick/London Stansted; this was subsequently operated by Air Astana to Amsterdam; however, the route was terminated, along with other Air Astana flights, due to the poor condition of the runway. The airport runway and facilities were inspected by Mott MacDonald to confirm that its substandard condition prevented the airport from accommodating larger jet aircraft. On 17 April 2013, the decision was made to transfer the airport's ownership back to the government for runway reconstruction.

A new terminal was built and opened on April 2022. It aims to double the capacity of the airport to 600 thousand people per year.

Airlines and destinations

Passenger

Cargo

Ground transport

Bus
The No 12 municipal bus line connects Ak Zhol International airport with centrally located Uralsk train station. Service is available from 06:00 to 22:00 daily.

Taxi
There is always a queue of available private taxi cabs at the airport parking lot.

Accidents and incidents
On 15 April 2006, a British Airways Boeing 747, G-BNLA, operating as flight number BA10 from Sydney to London via Bangkok with 354 passengers and 18 crew made an emergency landing at Uralsk Airport after a fire warning light went on in the cockpit. Although the only airport's landing strip is certified for operation of medium-sized aircraft the crew managed to perform a safe landing. There were no fatalities or reportable injuries, however the airport did not have the correct size of air stairs to reach the aircraft doors, the largest passenger aircraft that had operated on a regular basis previously had been an Air Astana Boeing 757. As the 747 was deemed too heavy for take-off smaller size aircraft were sent from Moscow and Bucharest to ferry the passengers to London.
On 28 August 2009, an Itek Air Boeing-737-200 en route from Bishkek to Moscow performed an emergency landing due to oil leak on the port engine.
On 17 November 2011, a Bek Air Fokker 100 operating as flight BEK-2011 from Almaty to Uralsk made an emergency landing in Uralsk after a go-around having a landing gear and cargo door failure alerts.

References

Airports built in the Soviet Union
Airports in Kazakhstan